The 2011 Dubai World Cup was a horse race held at Meydan Racecourse on Saturday 26 March 2011. It was the 16th running of the Dubai World Cup.

The winner was Yoshimi Ichikawa's Victoire Pisa, a four-year-old dark bay or brown colt trained in Japan by Katsuhiko Sumii and ridden by Mirco Demuro. Victoire Pisa's victory was the first in the race for his jockey, trainer and owner and the first for a horse trained in Japan.

Victoire Pisa had been the champion three-year-old colt in Japan in 2010 when he had won the Satsuki Shō and the Arima Kinen. Before being sent to Dubai he had been campaigned exclusively on turf: the World Cup was his first race on a synthetic surface. In the 2011 Dubai World Cup he started a 20/1 outsider and won by half a length from another Japanese horse Transcend (a dirt specialist), with the Godolphin runner Monterosso a neck away in third. The 2/1 favourite Twice Over finished ninth of the fourteen runners.

Race details
 Sponsor: Emirates Airline
 Purse: £6,410,256; First prize: £3,846,153
 Surface: Tapeta
 Going: Standard
 Distance: 10 furlongs
 Number of runners: 14
 Winner's time: 2:05.94

Full result

 Abbreviations: nse = nose; nk = neck; shd = head; hd = head; nk = neck

Winner's details
Further details of the winner, Victoire Pisa
 Sex: Colt
 Foaled: 31 March 2007
 Country: Japan
 Sire: Neo Universe; Dam: Whitewater Affair (Machiavellian)
 Owner: Yoshimi Ichikawa
 Breeder: Shadai Farm

References

Dubai World Cup
Dubai World Cup
Dubai World Cup
Dubai World Cup